Caracușenii may refer to one of two places in Briceni District, Moldova:

Caracușenii Vechi
Caracușenii Noi, a village in Berlinți Commune